Hale Products Incorporated is a unit of IDEX Corporation.  Like its parent, IDEX, Hale manufactures hydraulic equipment. However, this equipment is designed almost exclusively for the fire and rescue field.

References

External links 

Companies based in Conshohocken, Pennsylvania
Emergency services equipment makers
American companies established in 1914
1914 establishments in Pennsylvania
Manufacturing companies based in Pennsylvania